Bruno Koagne Tokam (born 30 December 1978) is a Cameroonian former professional footballer who played as a midfielder.

References

Living people
1978 births
People from Bafoussam
Cameroonian footballers
Association football midfielders
Russian Premier League players
Championnat National 3 players
Racing Club Bafoussam players
Unisport Bafang players
FC Chernomorets Novorossiysk players
UD Alzira footballers
Odivelas F.C. players
CO Châlons players
Cameroonian expatriate footballers
Cameroonian expatriate sportspeople in Russia
Expatriate footballers in Russia
Cameroonian expatriate sportspeople in Spain
Expatriate footballers in Spain
Cameroonian expatriate sportspeople in Portugal
Expatriate footballers in Portugal
Cameroonian expatriate sportspeople in France
Expatriate footballers in France